Jean-Baptiste du Casse (2 August 1646 – 25 June 1715) was a French privateer, admiral, and colonial administrator who served throughout the Atlantic World during the 17th and 18th centuries. Likely born 2 August 1646 in Saubusse, near Pau (Béarn), to a Huguenot family, du Casse joined the French merchant marine and served in the East India Company and the slave-trading Compagnie du Sénégal. Later, he joined the French Navy and took part in several victorious expeditions during the War of the League of Augsburg in the West Indies and Spanish South America. During the War of the Spanish Succession, he participated in several key naval battles, including the Battle of Málaga and the siege of Barcelona. For his service, he was made a knight of the Order of the Golden Fleece by King Philip V of Spain. In the midst of these wars, he was Governor of the colony of Saint-Domingue from 1691 to 1703. He ended his military career at the rank of Lieutenant General of the naval forces (the highest naval military rank at the time in France, equivalent of a modern vice-admiral) and Commander of the Royal and Military Order of Saint Louis. He died on 25 June 1715 in Bourbon-l'Archambault, Auvergne.

Origins and Family 
As fixed spellings of surnames was not yet common practice in his time, du Casse's surname has a variety of different spellings. The spelling of du Casse is from his birth record, but other records show Ducasse, Ducas, and Du Casse. His grand-nephew, Robert, who wrote a biography of Jean-Baptiste in 1876, spells both his great-uncle's and his own as du Casse.

Uncertainty exists around the birth of du Casse. Though he is usually said to have been born on 2 August 1646 in Saubusse, near Dax (Landes), the son of Bertrand Ducasse, a Bayonne ham merchant, and Marguerite de Lavigne, he was actually born in Pau to Jacques Ducasse and Judith Remy. His father Jacques was the son of Gaillard Ducasse, a minister in the Reformed Church of France, which designated the family as Huguenots. Because Huguenots were persecuted at this time in France, and their career prospects were limited, it is thought that du Casse forged his baptismal record to hide his Huguenot and ignoble background. Early biographers, including his grand-nephew and Saint-Simon, perpetuated this error in their works.

Du Casse admitted his family's religious background in a letter to Naval Minister Pontchartrain in 1691, and local records from Pau also support the Huguenot origins of the du Casse family. He renounced his Calvinist faith in 1685, however, after Louis XIV revoked the Edict of Nantes via the Edict of Fontainebleau.

He married Marthe (de) Baudry (1661-1743) on 16 Mar 1686 in Dieppe. She came from a family closely tied to banking and colonial trade. They had one daughter, Marthe du Casse, who married Louis de La Rochefoucauld, Marquis de Roye (1672-1751). Her father offered a dowry of 1,200,000 livres, an incredible sum at the time. Marthe and Louis had a son, Jean-Baptiste de La Rochefoucauld de Roye, who became a naval officer and led the ill-fated Duc d'Anville Expedition.

Career

Africa and the Slave Trade 
He went into the slave trade with the Compagnie de Sénégal, sailing between Africa and the Caribbean. With the money he earned from the slave trade he bought a ship in Saint-Domingue and began a career as a privateer. He eventually sailed to France and offered half of his loot to the Crown; for this he was appointed Lieutenant in the French Navy by Louis XIV.

War of the League of Augsburg 
In 1687 he tried to conquer Elmina, and in June 1689 he attacked Berbice and Fort Zeelandia in Surinam. He attacked St. Christopher shortly afterward alongside Jean Fantin, during which Fantin's handful of English crew (led by William Kidd and Robert Culliford) mutinied and stole Fantin's ship.

In 1691, he was appointed governor of St Domingue, and gained the respect of the buccaneers of the island. In the following months he plundered the English colonies in the vicinity, including Port Royal which had just been struck by a devastating earthquake. In 1694, his forces were defeated at Carlisle Bay, and he withdrew to St Domingue.

In 1697, under Baron de Pointis he successfully raided the South American city of Cartagena de Indias, but did not receive the promised 1/5 share of the loot. He then sailed to France, to claim his share from King Louis XIV in person. In fact he and his men received a compensation of 1.4 Million Francs. Furthermore, he was promoted to admiral and made a knight in the order of Saint Louis.

War of the Spanish Succession 
In later years he performed and committed a number of notable acts. In 1702, he defeated John Benbow near Santa Marta in what is known as the action of August 1702. Two years later he fought in the vanguard on the Intrépide during the Battle of Vélez-Málaga. In 1708, while in Spanish service, he commanded the Spanish treasure fleet during its annual voyage, suffering very few losses (a rarity at the time). For this he was awarded the Order of the Golden Fleece, the highest Spanish award possible.

In 1714 he commanded the French fleet during the Siege of Barcelona.

Governorship of Saint-Domingue 
He was governor of Saint-Domingue from 1691 to 1703.

He died on 25 June 1715 in the town of Bourbon-l'Archambault.

In popular culture
In the video game Assassin's Creed IV: Black Flag, Du Casse's nephew serves as one of the antagonists and the first boss. In the game, his name is Julien, and is 33 at his time of death in 1715, coincidentally the same year his uncle died as well. 
This character took to sea at a young age and fought alongside his real life uncle in the War for Spanish Succession, before deserting in favor of a brief tenure as a slave trader and subsequently as a mercenary prior to the game's start. He was one of the Templars in the game, while he was accompanied by Woodes Rogers and Laureano de Torres y Ayala.

See also 
 Du Casse, Robert Emmanuel Léon, Baron. L'Amiral Du Casse, chevalier de la toison d'or (1646-1715). Paris: 1876.
 Marley, David. Historic Cities of the Americas: An Illustrated Encyclopedia. Vols. 1–2. Santa Barbara, CA: ABC-CLIO, 2005.
 Pritchard, James. In Search of Empire: The French in the Americas, 1670-1730. Cambridge: Cambridge University Press, 2004.
 Saint-Simon, Louis de Rouvroy, Duke of. Mémoires complets et authentiques du duc de Saint-Simon. Vols. 4 and 7. Paris: Hachette, 1856–58.

Notes

1646 births
1715 deaths
People from Bayonne
French Navy admirals
French privateers
French naval commanders in the War of the Spanish Succession
Knights of the Order of Saint Louis
Knights of the Golden Fleece of Spain
Governors of Saint-Domingue
People of Saint-Domingue
18th-century pirates
French slave traders